Ayşe Sibel Ersoy, (born 1964 in Adana) is a Turkish politician, pharmacist and member of the 27th Parliament of Turkey from the Nationalist Movement Party (MHP) in Adana.

Life 
She is a graduate of the Ege University pharmacy faculty. Her masters was done at Gazi University in the branch of Pharmacology. In the Parliamentary Elections of 2018 she was elected into the Grand National Assembly representing Adana for the MHP where she became a member of the environment commission. Ersoy, who knows english to a very good level, is married and has tow children.

Sources 

Living people
1964 births
Nationalist Movement Party politicians